Each article in this category is a collection of entries about several stamp issuers, presented in alphabetical order. The entries are formulated on the micro model and provide summary information about all known issuers.

See the :Category:Compendium of postage stamp issuers page for details of the project.

Tokelau 

Dates 	1948 –
Capital 
Currency  	(1948) 12 pence = 1 shilling; 20 shillings = 1 pound
		(1967) 100 cents = 1 dollar
		(1982) 100 sene (cents) = 1 tola (dollar)

Main Article Postage stamps and postal history of Tokelau

Tolima 

Dates 	1870 – 1903
Currency  	100 centavos = 1 peso

Refer  	Colombian Territories

Tonga 

Dates 	1886 –
Capital 	Nukuʻalofa
Currency  	(1886) 12 pence = 1 shilling; 20 shillings = 1 pound
		(1967) 100 seniti = 1 pa'anga

Main Article Postage stamps and postal history of Tonga

Tongking 

Refer 	Annam & Tongking

Toypkia 

Refer 	Greek Post Offices in the Turkish Empire

Transbaikal Province 

Dates 	1920 only
Capital 	Chita
Currency  	100 kopecks = 1 Russian ruble

Refer 	Russian Civil War Issues

Transcaucasian Federation 

Dates 	1923 – 1924
Capital 	Tbilisi
Currency  	100 kopecks = 1 Russian ruble

See also 	Armenia;
		Azerbaijan;
		Georgia;
		Union of Soviet Socialist Republics (USSR)

Transjordan 

Dates 	1920 – 1949
Capital 	Amman
Currency  	1000 milliemes = 100 piastres = 1 pound

Refer  	Jordan

Transkei 

One of the territories ( Bantustans ) set up by the South African government as part of its apartheid policy.
Although the territory itself did not acquire international recognition, its stamps were
valid for postage.

Dates 	1977 – 1994
Capital 	Mthatha
Currency  	100 cents = 1 rand

Refer 	South African Territories

Transvaal 

Dates 	1869 – 1910
Capital 	Pretoria
Currency  	12 pence = 1 shilling; 20 shillings = 1 pound

Main Article Needed 

Includes 	Lydenburg;
		New Republic;
		Pietersburg;
		Rustenburg;
		Schweizer–Renecke;
		South African Republic;
		Volksrust;
		Wolmaransstad

Transylvania (Romanian Occupation) 

Dates 	1919 only
Currency  	100 bani = 1 leu

Refer 	Romanian Post Abroad

Travancore 

Dates 	1888 – 1949
Capital 	Trivandrum
Currency  	16 cash = 1 chuckram; 28 chuckrams = 1 rupee

Refer 	Indian Native States

See also   	Travancore-Cochin

Travancore-Cochin 

Dates 	1949 – 1951
Capital 	Trivandrum
Currency  	12 pies = 1 anna; 16 annas = 1 rupee

Refer 	Indian Native States

See also   	Cochin;
		Travancore

Trebizonde (Russian Post Office) 

Dates 	1909 – 1910
Currency  	40 paras = 1 piastre

Refer 	Russian Post Offices in the Turkish Empire

Trengganu 

Dates 	1910 –
Capital 	Kuala Trengganu
Currency  	100 cents = 1 dollar

Main Article Needed 

See also 	Malaysia

Trentino (Italian Occupation) 

Dates 	1918 – 1919
Currency  	Austrian and Italian used concurrently

Refer  	Italian Occupation Issues

Trieste 

Main Article Needed 

Includes 	Trieste (Allied Military Government);
		Trieste (Yugoslav Military Government)

See also   	Venezia Giulia & Istria

Trieste (Allied Military Government) 

Dates 	1947 – 1954
Currency 	100 centesimi = 1 lira

Refer 	Trieste

Trieste (Yugoslav Military Government) 

Dates 	1948 – 1954
Currency 	(1948) 100 centesimi = 1 lira
		(1949) 100 paras = 1 dinar

Refer 	Trieste

Trinidad 

Dates 	1851 – 1913
Capital 	Port of Spain
Currency  	12 pence = 1 shilling; 20 shillings = 1 pound

Refer 	Trinidad & Tobago

Trinidad & Tobago 

Dates 	1913 –
Capital 	Port of Spain
Currency  	(1913) 12 pence = 1 shilling; 20 shillings = 1 pound
		(1935) 100 cents = 1 dollar

Main Article Postage stamps and postal history of Trinidad and Tobago

Includes 	Tobago;
		Trinidad

Tripoli (Italian Post Office) 

Dates 	1909 – 1912
Currency  	100 centesimi = 1 lira

Refer  	Italian Post Offices in the Turkish Empire

Tripolitania 

Dates 	1923 – 1943
Capital  	Tripoli
Currency  	100 centesimi = 1 lira

Tripolitania (British Administration) 

Dates 	1950 – 1952
Currency  	Military Administration Lire (MAL)

Refer  	BA/BMA Issues

Tripolitania (British Military Administration) 

Dates 	1948 – 1950
Currency  	Military Administration Lire (MAL)

Refer  	BA/BMA Issues

Tripolitania (British Occupation) 

Refer  	Tripolitania (British Administration);
		Tripolitania (British Military Administration)

Tristan da Cunha 

Dates 	1952 –
Capital 	
Currency  	(1952) 12 pence = 1 shilling; 20 shillings = 1 pound
		(1961) 100 cents = 1 rand
		(1963) 12 pence = 1 shilling; 20 shillings = 1 pound
		(1971) 100 pence = 1 pound

Main Article Postage stamps and postal history of Tristan da Cunha

Trucial States 
Dates
1961 – 1972
Currency
100 naye paise = 1 rupee
Main Article
Postage stamps and postal history of the Trucial States
Includes
Ajman;
Fujeira;
Ras Al Khaima;
Sharjah;
Umm Al Qiwain
See also
Abu Dhabi;
British Postal Agencies in Eastern Arabia;
Dubai;
United Arab Emirates (UAE)

Tsingtao 

Refer 	Kiautschou

Tunisia 

Dates 	1888 –
Capital 	Tunis
Currency  	(1888) 100 centimes = 1 franc
		(1959) 1000 milliemes = 1 dinar

Main Article Postage stamps and postal history of Tunisia

Turkey 

Dates 	1863 –
Capital 	Constantinople (to 1923);
Ankara (since 1923)
Currency  (1863) 40 paras = 1 piastre
	(1926) 40 paras = 1 grush
	(1929) 40 paras = 1 kurus
	(1942) 100 paras = 1 kurus
	(1949) 100 kurus = 1 lira

Main Article Postage stamps and postal history of Turkey

Includes 	Compendium of postage stamp issuers (Al – Aq)#Angora (Ankara);
	Thessaly (Turkish Occupation)

Turkish Cypriot Posts 

Dates 	1974 –
Currency  	(1974) 1000 mils = 1 pound
		(1978) 100 kurus = 1 lira

Main Article Needed

Turkish Empire (Foreign Post Offices) 

Refer 	Austro-Hungarian Post Offices in the Turkish Empire;
		British Post Offices in the Turkish Empire;
		Constantinople (Polish Post Office);
		Egyptian Post Offices in the Turkish Empire;
		French Post Offices in the Turkish Empire;
		German Post Offices in the Turkish Empire;
		German Post Offices in the Turkish Empire;
		Italian Post Offices in the Turkish Empire;
		Romanian Post Offices in the Turkish Empire;
		Russian Post Offices in the Turkish Empire

Turkmenistan 

Dates 	1992 –
Capital 	Ashkabad
Currency 	(1992) 100 kopecks = 1 Russian ruble
		(1994) 100 tenge = 1 manat

Main Article Postage stamps and postal history of Turkmenistan

See also 	Union of Soviet Socialist Republics (USSR)

Turks Islands 

Dates 	1867 – 1900
Capital 	Cockburn Town
Currency  	12 pence = 1 shilling; 20 shillings = 1 pound

Refer 	Turks & Caicos Islands

Turks & Caicos Islands 

Dates 	1900 –
Capital 	Cockburn Town (Grand Turk)
Currency  	(1900) 12 pence = 1 shilling; 20 shillings = 1 pound (£)
		(1969) 100 cents = 1 dollar

Main Article Postage stamps and postal history of the Turks and Caicos Islands

Includes 	Caicos Islands;
		Turks Islands

Tuscany 

Dates 	1851 – 1860
Capital 	Firenze (Florence)
Currency  	(1851) 60 quattrini = 20 soldi = 12 crazie = 1 Tuscan lira
		(1859) 1 Tuscan lira = 1 Italian lira

Refer 	Italian States

Tuva 

Dates 	1926 – 1944
Capital 	Kyzyl
Currency  	(1926) 100 kopecks = 1 Russian ruble
		(1935) 100 kopecks = 1 tugrik
		(1936) 100 kopecks = 1 aksha

Main Article Postage stamps and postal history of Tannu Tuva

See also 	Union of Soviet Socialist Republics (USSR)

Tuvalu 

Dates 	1976 –
Capital 	Funafuti
Currency  	100 cents = 1 dollar

Main Article Postage stamps and postal history of Tuvalu

See also 	Gilbert & Ellice Islands

References

Bibliography
 Stanley Gibbons Ltd, Europe and Colonies 1970, Stanley Gibbons Ltd, 1969
 Stanley Gibbons Ltd, various catalogues
 Stuart Rossiter & John Flower, The Stamp Atlas, W H Smith, 1989
 XLCR Stamp Finder and Collector's Dictionary, Thomas Cliffe Ltd, c.1960

External links
 AskPhil – Glossary of Stamp Collecting Terms
 Encyclopaedia of Postal History

Tok